Khogyani is located 17 km northwest of Ghazni. It was the district center of the big Jaghatu district before the year 2005. Now it is the center of Khogyani District.

See also
 Ghazni Province

Populated places in Ghazni Province